This is an inclusive list of science fiction television programs whose names begin with the letter W.

W
Live-action
The Walking Dead, The (2010–present)
War Next Door, The (2000)
War of the Worlds (franchise):
War of the Worlds (1988–1990)
War of the Worlds, The (2019, UK)
War of the Worlds (2019–present, US/UK/France)
Warehouse 13 (2009–2014)
The Warlord: Battle for the Galaxy a.k.a. Osiris Chronicles, The (1998, film)
Wayward Pines
Wedlock a.k.a. Deadlock (1991, film)
Weird City (2019)
Welcome to Paradox (1998)
Welt am Draht a.k.a. World on a Wire (1973, Germany, miniseries, film)
Westinghouse Studio One (1948–1958, anthology) (elements of science fiction in this episode)
Westworld (2016–2022)
Whispers, The (2015)
White Dwarf (1995, film) White Dwarf IMDb
Whitney and the Robot (1978–1989) IMDb
Wicked Science (2004–2006, Australia)
Wild Palms (1993, miniseries)
Wild Wild West, The (1965–1969)
Wizard, The (1986–1987)
Wizards vs Aliens (2012–2014, UK)
Wolf Lake (2001)
Wonder Woman (franchise):
Wonder Woman (2011, pilot) IMDb
Wonder Woman (1975–1979)
Wonder Woman (1974, film, pilot) IMDb
Who's Afraid of Diana Prince? (1967) IMDb
Woops! (1992)
World of Giants (1959) IMDb

Animated
Walking with... a.k.a. Trilogy of Life a.k.a. Walking with Prehistoric Life (UK, docufiction) (franchise):
Prehistoric Park (2006, UK, miniseries, docufiction)
Walking with Monsters (2005, UK, film series, docufiction)
Walking with Cavemen (2003, UK, miniseries, docufiction)
Sea Monsters – A Walking with Dinosaurs Trilogy (2003, UK, miniseries, docufiction)
Chased by Dinosaurs (2002, UK, miniseries, docufiction)
Walking with Beasts (2001, UK, miniseries, docufiction)
Ballad of Big Al, The a.k.a. Allosaurus: a Walking with Dinosaurs Special (2001, UK, miniseries, docufiction)
Walking with Dinosaurs (1999, UK, miniseries, docufiction)
Wallace and Gromit (franchise):
A Grand Day Out a.k.a. A Grand Day Out with Wallace and Gromit (1989, UK, stop-motion animation, film)
Shaun the Sheep (2007–2010, Wallace and Gromit spin-off, UK, stop-motion animation) (elements of science fiction in The Visitor, Shaun Encounters and Cat Got Your Brain episodes)
Wakusei Robo Danguard Ace (1977–1978, Japan, animated)
Web Woman (1978–1980, animated, Tarzan and the Super 7 segment)
Whatever Happened to Robot Jones? (2002–2003, animated)
Wild Arms: Twilight Venom (1999–2000, Japan, animated)
Wild C.A.T.s (1994–1996, animated)
Wing Commander Academy (1996, animated)
World Destruction: Sekai Bokumetsu no Rokunin a.k.a. World Destruction: The Six People That Will Destroy the World (2008, Japan, animated)

References

Television programs, W